β-Eleostearic acid, or (9E,11E,13E)-octadeca-9,11,13-trienoic acid, is an organic compound with formula  or H3C(CH2)3(CH=CH)3(CH2)7COOH.  It is an all-trans isomer of octadecatrienoic acid.

See also
 α-Eleostearic acid, the (9Z,11E,13E)-isomer, found in tung oil and bitter gourd seed oil.

Fatty acids
Alkenoic acids
Polyenes